The 2022–23 season is Sreenidi Deccan Football Clubs Second season. They participated in the I-League.

On 5 June 2020, All India Football Federation issued an invitation to accept bids for new clubs to join the I-League from 2020 onwards; on 12 August, Sreenidi Deccan were granted playing rights directly in the 2021–22 season.

First-team squad

Transfers and loans

Transfers in

Transfers Out

Loans Out

Technical staff

Pre-season

I-League

League table

Matches 
Note: I-league announced the fixtures for the 2022–23 season on 1 November 2022.

Super Cup 

After finishing 2nd in the I-League, Sreenidhi will have to play a qualifier against play off winners to earn a place in the group stage.

Matches

Qualifiers

Statistics

Goal Scorers

References

Sreenidi Deccan FC seasons
Sreenidi Deccan